David Brain may refer to:

David Brain (born 1964), Zimbabwean cricketer
Dave Brain (1879–1959), English baseball player

See also
David Braine (disambiguation)